Somewhere in Europe is a 1948 Hungarian drama film directed by Géza von Radványi. It depicts the aftermath of World War II and specifically the lives of a gang of orphaned children in a postwar setting. The gang of children steal, cheat, and pillage due largely to the harsh circumstances and the world around them. The film has been compared to Italian neorealism. The film was chosen to be part of the New Budapest Twelve, a list of Hungarian films considered the best in 2000.

Cast 
 Artúr Somlay - Piotr Simon
 Miklós Gábor - Hosszú
 Zsuzsa Bánki - Éva
 György Bárdy - Police Commissioner

References

External links

Films about orphans
1948 drama films
1948 films
Hungarian drama films
Hungarian black-and-white films